The Glasgow and Ibrox Tramway operated a horse tramway service in Glasgow between 1879 and 1891.

History

The Glasgow and Ibrox Tramway Company built this line from Ibrox to the Paisley Toll Road on the Govan boundary with Glasgow where it connected with the Vale of Clyde Tramways.

Closure

Unable to make a profit, the company went bankrupt on 25 May 1891 and sold the line to the Glasgow Commissioners of Police on 10 July 1893. From 1891 the services were operated by Glasgow Tramway and Omnibus Company. It was taken over by Glasgow Corporation Tramways on 10 November 1896.

References

Tram transport in Scotland
4 ft 7¾ in gauge railways in Scotland
1879 establishments in Scotland
1891 disestablishments in Scotland
Govan
Transport companies established in 1879
Transport companies disestablished in 1891
British companies disestablished in 1891
British companies established in 1879